The 1985 Football League Cup Final was won by Norwich City. The Canaries defeated Sunderland 1–0 at Wembley Stadium on 24 March 1985 with an own goal scored by Gordon Chisholm, who deflected Asa Hartford's shot past goalkeeper Chris Turner. Later in the second half, Clive Walker missed a penalty awarded for a handball by Norwich defender Dennis van Wijk.

Looking back on the final, Norwich striker Mick Channon described the final as a "lovely day", and praised his teammates' skill, saying, "we had some tremendous players like Steve Bruce and Dave Watson in the middle of the defence, Asa Hartford in midfield and John Deehan up front with me." In the lead-up to Norwich's goal Sunderland defender David Corner was attempting to usher the ball out of play for a Sunderland goal kick.
However, Norwich kept the ball in play and promptly scored. In November 2011 Corner looked back on the incident stating "I should have kicked the ball out" and that he doesn't "think there's a day goes by where that game isn't mentioned". He then went on to say "It was a great honour for me to be playing for my hometown club in a national final, but I have to hold my hands up and say the goal was my fault." Norwich's victory was celebrated with an open-top bus parade.

Despite Norwich and Sunderland appearing in the final, they were both relegated to the Second Division at the end of the 1984–85 season. 

As a result of the good faith shared between Norwich and Sunderland supporters during the final, the Friendship Trophy is contested every time the two clubs meet.

Match details

Route to the final

Norwich and Sunderland were both playing in the First Division and both entered the competition at the second round stage, under the tournament format in place at the time which saw First Division teams enter in this round. Norwich had reached the Football League Cup final on three occasions, winning one of them. Sunderland had never reached a final – the closest they came was the 1962–63 edition where they were semi-finalists. Norwich faced Preston North End in their second round tie, and played out a 3–3 stalemate in the first leg. In the second leg they defeated Preston 6–1, a 9–4 victory on aggregate. Having drawn the third round game against Aldershot 0–0, Norwich beat Aldershot in the replay 4–0 to progress to the next round. A tie against Second Division side Notts County awaited Norwich in the fourth round, which they won 3–0. They dispatched Grimsby Town 1–0 in the fifth round to set up an all East Anglian semi-final with Ipswich Town. Ipswich had beaten Norwich 1–0 in the first leg, but Norwich prevailed by winning 2–0 in the second leg, and 2–1 on aggregate.

North East Sunderland began the tournament against Crystal Palace, winning it 2–1 on aggregate, which was the same score as the first leg. Next Sunderland beat Nottingham Forest 1–0 in the third round replay, having drawn 1–1 in the original match. The fourth round went similarly the third, Sunderland played out a 0–0 draw at Roker Park forcing the game into a replay. Goals from Gordon Chisholm and Clive Walker in the replay ensured that Sunderland would progress in the fifth round. Sunderland beat Watford in the fifth round to seal a tie against Chelsea in the semi-finals. Sunderland beat Chelsea 5–2 on aggregate and secured their first ever League Cup final spot.

References

EFL Cup Finals
League Cup Final 1985
League Cup Final 1985
1984–85 Football League
League Cup Final
League Cup Final